Richard Roswell Lyman (November 23, 1870 – December 31, 1963) was an American engineer and religious leader who was an apostle in the Church of Jesus Christ of Latter-day Saints (LDS Church) from 1918 to 1943.

Lyman is often noted as the most recent LDS Church apostle to have been excommunicated.  In 1943, J. Reuben Clark, the first counselor in the LDS church's First Presidency and the church's de facto leader due to church president Heber J. Grant's poor health, became aware that Lyman had for a number of years been in an intimate relationship with a woman he had earlier been assigned to counsel.  The Quorum of the Twelve Apostles convened a disciplinary council to hear the case and Lyman's explanation, after which he was immediately excommunicated. Lyman was rebaptized in 1954 at age 83, and his full priesthood blessings were restored posthumously in 1970.

Early life and family
Lyman was born in Fillmore, Utah Territory, and was closely related to many early leaders of the LDS Church. His father, Francis M. Lyman, was the son of Amasa M. Lyman, both of whom served as LDS Church apostles. His mother was Clara Caroline Callister, whose grandfather was John Smith, church founder Joseph Smith's uncle, and a church Presiding Patriarch. Clara's mother was Caroline Smith Callister, the only sister of apostle George A. Smith, who served with Brigham Young as a counselor in the church's First Presidency. Lyman was ordained an elder of the LDS Church on August 29, 1891, by Joseph F. Smith.

Education and marriage
Lyman graduated from high school at Brigham Young Academy (BYA) in Provo, Utah, in 1891 with a Normal Certificate, taught at Brigham Young College in Logan, Utah, and later studied at the University of Michigan, graduating with a BS degree in 1895. He later pursued graduate studies in civil engineering, earning an MA from the University of Chicago in 1903 and a PhD from Cornell University in 1905.

Lyman had planned to marry Amy Brown, whom he met as a student at BYA, but delayed this while he attended the University of Michigan. Lyman was a teacher and civil engineer and was known for his work on the Utah State Road Commission. Lyman married Amy Brown on September 9, 1896; the marriage was performed by Joseph F. Smith in the Salt Lake Temple. From 1895 to 1896, Lyman taught at BYA. Lyman's wife served as the eighth general president of the Relief Society from 1940 to 1945.

Apostleship
Lyman was ordained an apostle on April 7, 1918. As an apostle, he served as a member of the superintendency of the Young Men's Mutual Improvement Association until 1935.

Excommunication
In 1943, the First Presidency discovered that Lyman had long been cohabiting with a woman other than his legal wife. In 1925, Lyman began his relationship with Anna Jacobsen Hegsted, which he defined as a plural marriage. Unable to trust anyone to officiate at the wedding due to the church's ban on the practice, Lyman and Hegsted exchanged vows secretly. By 1943, both were in their seventies. Lyman was excommunicated on November 12, 1943, at age 72; at the time, his legal wife, Amy B. Lyman, was the general president of the Relief Society. The Quorum of the Twelve provided the newspapers with a one-sentence announcement, stating that the grounds for excommunication was a violation of the law of chastity, which was the standard interpretation of new plural marriages performed since the 1904 Second Manifesto. (Plural marriages performed between the First Manifesto in 1890 and the Second Manifesto were tolerated by the church.) After the excommunication, J. Reuben Clark worried that Lyman might join the Mormon fundamentalist movement.

Lyman later returned to the LDS Church through rebaptism on October 27, 1954, but he was not reinstated as an apostle. He died at Salt Lake City, Utah.

Notes

References
 2005 Deseret Morning News Church Almanac (Salt Lake City, Utah: Deseret Morning News, 2004) p. 65.
 
 Kimball, Edward L. & Andrew E. Kimball Jr., Spencer W. Kimball: Twelfth President of the Church of Jesus Christ of Latter-day Saints (Salt Lake City, Utah: Bookcraft, 1977) p. 208-210.
 Quinn, D. Michael, Elder Statesman: A Biography of J. Reuben Clark (Salt Lake City, Utah: Signature Books, 2002): 252-253.
 Quinn, D. Michael, Same-Sex Dynamics Among Nineteenth Century Americas: The Mormon Example (Urbana & Chicago: University of Illinois Press, 1996): 371-372.
 Quinn, D. Michael, The Mormon Hierarchy: Extensions of Power (Salt Lake City, Utah: Signature Books, 1997): 183.
 Sillito, John R., "Enigmatic Apostle: The Excommunication of Richard R. Lyman." Paper presented at Sunstone Symposium, Salt Lake City, Utah, 1991.

External links
Richard Roswell Lyman papers, MSS 1079 at L. Tom Perry Special Collections, Harold B. Lee Library, Brigham Young University
Richard Roswell Lyman's diary at L. Tom Perry Special Collections, Harold B. Lee Library, Brigham Young University

1870 births
1963 deaths
20th-century Mormon missionaries
American Mormon missionaries in the United Kingdom
American general authorities (LDS Church)
Apostles (LDS Church)
Brigham Young Academy alumni
Brigham Young Academy faculty
Brigham Young College faculty
Cornell University College of Engineering alumni
Counselors in the General Presidency of the Young Men (organization)
Latter Day Saints from Michigan
Latter Day Saints from Utah
Mormonism and polygamy
People excommunicated by the Church of Jesus Christ of Latter-day Saints
People from Fillmore, Utah
Smith family (Latter Day Saints)
University of Chicago alumni
University of Michigan alumni
Excommunicated general authorities (LDS Church)